This is a list of women Senators who have been elected or appointed to Seanad Éireann, the upper house of the Oireachtas, the bicameral parliament of Ireland.

Women in Seanad Éireann

Timeline

Number of women in each Seanad

See also
Families in the Oireachtas
List of women in Dáil Éireann
Records of members of the Oireachtas

Sources

Seanad
Women
 
Seanad